John "Jack" McLean (January 31, 1923 – October 14, 2003) was a Canadian ice hockey player who played for the Toronto Maple Leafs for three seasons, from 1942–43 until 1944–45. He scored the game-winning goal at the 10:18 mark of the fourth overtime period against the Detroit Red Wings on March 23, 1943 - one of the longest games in Stanley Cup playoffs history. Jack was part of the Toronto Maple Leafs' Stanley Cup championship in 1944–45.

McLean was born in Winnipeg, Manitoba and was a 19-year-old university student when he joined the Leafs, playing forward at a time when many regulars left to join the war effort. McLean did not practise with the Leafs, and with but a few exceptions, was allowed only to play games in Canada (at home in Toronto and in Montreal). Whereas many young men dreamed of playing in the NHL, Jack used his NHL career to provide a university degree in engineering, which became his career after retiring in 1945.

After moving to Ottawa in 1946, Jack joined the Ottawa Senators of the Quebec Senior Hockey League, and helped the team reach the Allan Cup final in 1948.

Career statistics

Regular season and playoffs

External links 
 

1923 births
2003 deaths
Canadian ice hockey centres
Ontario Hockey Association Senior A League (1890–1979) players
Ottawa Senators (QSHL) players
Ice hockey people from Winnipeg
Stanley Cup champions
Toronto Maple Leafs players
Toronto Young Rangers players
University of Toronto alumni